Başkent University Medical and Research Center of Alanya is a medical and research center in Alanya, Turkey. It is one of the Başkent University hospitals in Turkey. The center was opened on 10 July 2000. The center has a certificate of  ISO-EN 9001:2000 Quality system. There are nearly 100 beds in the Block A and policlinics in the Block B. There's also a dialysis center within. It has nearly 650 personnel.

External links
 Web Site of the center

General director : Cevahir Haberal

Alanya
Hospitals established in 2000
Buildings and structures in Antalya Province
Teaching hospitals in Turkey